Tarasivka is a small village about  east of Kropyvnytskyi in Oleksandriia Raion, Kirovohrad Oblast (province) of southern Ukraine. It is located by the Lake Stepivka. Tarasivka belongs to Popelnaste rural hromada, one of the hromadas of Ukraine. The village is named for Taras Bulba.

References

Villages in Oleksandriia Raion